The Wisconsin Veterans Museum, located on Capitol Square in Madison, Wisconsin, United States, is dedicated to telling the stories of the veterans of the state of Wisconsin.

The museum is composed of two galleries that chronicle the history of Wisconsin citizens who served in the U.S. military from the American Civil War to present day. The Wisconsin Veterans Museum is an educational activity of the Wisconsin Department of Veterans Affairs.

The museum dates to 1901 when it was established as the Grand Army of the Republic Memorial Hall in the Wisconsin State Capitol.

Description

The 19th century gallery showcases Wisconsin's involvement in the Civil War. It includes a large diorama depicting the Battle of Antietam.

In the 20th century gallery, exhibits illustrate Wisconsin veterans' roles in the Mexican Border campaign, the First and Second World Wars and also the Korean, Vietnam, Persian Gulf War and recent conflicts. Three full-scale aircraft, a Sopwith Camel from World War I, a P-51 Mustang from World War II and a Huey helicopter from the Vietnam War, are displayed in the gallery as well.  New additions include Medal of Honor and War on Terror exhibits.

Located at 30 West Mifflin Street in Madison since 1993, the Wisconsin Veterans Museum has been accredited by the American Alliance of Museums since the 1970s and became a Smithsonian Affiliate in 2014.

External links
Official website
Wisconsin Battle Flags from the Collection of the Wisconsin Veterans Museum

Wisconsin in the American Civil War
Military and war museums in Wisconsin
Museums in Madison, Wisconsin
American Civil War museums in Wisconsin